Strange Bedfellows is a 1965 American romantic comedy film directed by Melvin Frank and starring Rock Hudson, Gina Lollobrigida, Gig Young, and Terry-Thomas. It was released by Universal Studios.

Plot
Carter, a wealthy American (Hudson) and Toni, a bohemian Italian woman (Lollobrigida) meet in London, and impulsively marry. Then finding they have virtually nothing in common, they separate. Seven years later, just days before they are to take steps to move forward on their divorce, they meet again and begin to rekindle the romance. More turmoil ensues as Carter tries to establish a 'respectable family life' in order to ensure a promotion, and Toni continues involving herself in public protests.

Cast

 Rock Hudson as Carter Harrison
 Gina Lollobrigida as  Toni Vincente
 Gig Young as Richard Bramwell
 Edward Judd as Harry Jones
 Terry-Thomas as Assistant Mortician
 Arthur Haynes as Carter's Taxi Driver
 Howard St. John as J. L. Stevens
 Nancy Kulp as Aggressive Woman
 David King as Toni's Taxi Driver
 Peggy Rea as Mavis Masters
 Joseph Sirola as Petracini
 Lucy Landau as Jolly Woman
 Bernard Fox as Policeman
 James McCallion as Old Man
 Edith Atwater as Mrs. Stevens
 Hedley Mattingly as Bagshot
 John Orchard as Radio Dispatcher
 Henry Corden as Sheik's Interpreter (uncredited)
 Maurice Dallimore as Gentleman in Rain (uncredited)
 Noel Drayton as Cab Driver (uncredited)
 Jack Good as Binky Waring (uncredited)
 Simon Scott as Jim Slade, Divorce Lawyer (uncredited)

Release
The film earned rentals in North America of $2,750,000. Strange Bedfellows was available on DVD on July 1, 2003.

Novelization
Slightly in advance of the film's release, as was the custom of the era, a paperback novelization of the screenplay was published by Pyramid Books. The author was renowned crime and western novelist Marvin H. Albert, who also made something of a cottage industry out of movie tie-ins. He seems to have been the most prolific screenplay novelizer of the late '50s through mid '60s, and, during that time, the preeminent specialist at light comedy.

See also
List of American films of 1965

References

Sources

External links 

1965 films
1965 romantic comedy films
American romantic comedy films
1960s English-language films
Films about marriage
Films directed by Melvin Frank
Films scored by Leigh Harline
Films set in London
Films shot in London
Universal Pictures films
1960s American films